The Henry B. Dickson House is a house located in northeast Portland, Oregon, listed on the National Register of Historic Places.

See also
 National Register of Historic Places listings in Northeast Portland, Oregon

References

External links
 

1909 establishments in Oregon
Bungalow architecture in Oregon
Colonial Revival architecture in Oregon
Houses completed in 1909
Houses on the National Register of Historic Places in Portland, Oregon
Irvington, Portland, Oregon
Portland Historic Landmarks